Leucine-rich repeat serine/threonine-protein kinase 1 is an enzyme that in humans is encoded by the LRRK1 gene.

References

Further reading